Manzanita Sol is a brand of apple-flavored soft drinks owned by PepsiCo and is predominant in Mexico. In the United States it is sold in 12-pack cans, 2-liter, and 20-ounce bottles.  The drink is known to be available at Walmart, Albertsons, H-E-B, Ralphs, Kmart, Food 4 Less, Jewel-Osco, Dominick's, Target, Vons, Stater Bros., United Supermarkets in the Amarillo and Lubbock, Texas area, and other smaller chains and smaller family run stores. In Latin American countries, Manzanita Sol competes with Coca-Cola's Manzana Lift. Manzanita Sol is PepsiCo's number two brand in Mexico, with apple being Mexico's second most popular soft drink flavor. It is also very popular in border regions such as the Los Angeles and El Paso metro areas.

In January 2014, Taco Bell added Manzanita Sol to their choice of beverages. This beverage product became available at Golden Corral a year later. In 2017, both Taco Bell and Golden Corral removed Manzanita Sol from their choice of beverages.

"Manzanita Sol" is Spanish for "little apple sun".

References

External links 
 Manzanita Sol official Facebook page
 DeliciousSparklingTemperanceDrinks.net, description and review

PepsiCo soft drinks
Apple sodas